The women's 800 metres competition at the 2018 Asian Games took place on 27 and 28 August 2018 at the Gelora Bung Karno Stadium.

Schedule
All times are Western Indonesia Time (UTC+07:00)

Records

Results

Round 1
 Qualification: First 2 in each heat (Q) and the next 2 fastest (q) advance to the final.

Heat 1

Heat 2

Heat 3

Final

References

Women's 800 metres
2018 women